Jolly Roger  (1922 – July 3, 1948) was an American steeplechase racehorse whose outstanding career saw him inducted into the  National Museum of Racing and Hall of Fame.

Background 
Jolly Roger was a chestnut with 4 white stockings and a blaze. He was bred by his owner, Payne Whitney. Jolly Roger's sire was Pennant, whose sire was Hall of Fame inductee Peter Pan. Jolly Roger was trained by Vincent Powers.

Flat years
Jolly Roger first raced on the flat racehorse but with only one win from ten starts was switched to jumps racing.

Jumping career highlights

3-year old jump season
Jolly Roger became an American Novice jumper with his biggest win being the Elkridge Steeplechase.

4-year old season
As a 4 year old  he improved with 2 big wins in the Wingfield Steeplechase Handicap and the Wheatley Steeplechase Handicap.

5-6 year old season
As a 5-6 year old he was at his peak and won an epic rivalry between another hall of fame American Steeplechaser in Fairmount. During this time, Jolly Roger won the prestigious Grand National Hurdle Stakes for the first time. He also won the Brook and the Bayside Steeplechase Handicaps, the Charles L. Appleton Memorial Cup and the Corinthian Steeplechase as a five-year-old. At age 6, he won his second and last Grand National Hurdle Stakes.

7 year old season
As a 7 year old Jolly Roger was dormant and never won a race in 4 starts. He could only go for 3 3rd's and a 2nd.

8-year old season
At age 8, Jolly Roger competed in 8 races with two victories in the Glendale and the North American Steeplechase Handicaps. He finished his career as the richest American steeplechaser and in 1965 was inducted into the National Museum of Racing and Hall of Fame for his accomplishments in American jump racing.

External links
 Jolly Roger's pedigree and race info

References

1922 racehorse births
1948 racehorse deaths
Racehorses bred in Kentucky
Racehorses trained in the United States
American steeplechase racehorses
United States Thoroughbred Racing Hall of Fame inductees
Thoroughbred family 5-g